Joachim Jerzy Marx (born 31 August 1944) is a Polish former professional footballer who played as a striker. Besides Poland, he has played in France.

On the national level, he played for Poland national team (23 matches/10 goals) and was a participant at the 1972 Summer Olympics, where his team won the gold medal.

With Ruch Chorzów, he played 162 matches in the Ekstraklasa scoring 66 goals. With Marx, Ruch won the national championship (1974 and 1975), and the Polish Cup (1974).

Later in his career, Marx went to France, where he played most notably for RC Lens (second place in Ligue 1 in 1977). Since ending his professional career in 1982, Marx worked as a coach in France.

Marx was famed for the power of his shot.

References 

 
 

Living people
1944 births
Association football forwards
Polish footballers
Poland international footballers
Footballers at the 1972 Summer Olympics
Olympic gold medalists for Poland
Olympic footballers of Poland
Ruch Chorzów players
RC Lens players
Expatriate footballers in France
Sportspeople from Gliwice
Polish football managers
RC Lens managers
LB Châteauroux managers
Ligue 1 players
Expatriate football managers in France
Olympic medalists in football
Gwardia Warsaw players
Medalists at the 1972 Summer Olympics
US Nœux-les-Mines players
Piast Gliwice players